McClellan Township is one of ten townships in Newton County, Indiana. As of the 2010 census, its population was 217 and it contained 109 housing units.

History
McClellan Township was established in 1862.

Geography
McClellan township used to include Beaver Lake with its Bogus islands, before it was drained.

Unincorporated towns
 Enos at 
(This list is based on USGS data and may include former settlements.)

References

External links
 Indiana Township Association
 United Township Association of Indiana

Townships in Newton County, Indiana
Townships in Indiana
1862 establishments in Indiana